Strathaird is a locality in the Southern Tablelands of New South Wales, Australia in Upper Lachlan Shire. It is located 6.8km  to the south of the township of Taralga, on the Goulburn road.

The suburb is roughly equivalent to the cadastral parish of Strathaird in the County of Argyle.

The village was a stop on the Taralga railway line and the station remains today.

History
The area around Strathaird was the traditional land of the Burra Burra aboriginal peoples, a warlike tribe who often clashed with neighbouring tribes. Their last great gathering or corroboree seems to have been in the 1830s after which they are not recorded by European history. Accordingly, they would have been pushed further west to less fertile plains after the disease brought by the Europeans.

Charles Throsby passed through the area in 1819 journeying from Cowpastures to Bathurst in search of new grazing lands. By 1824, John Macarthur's son James and his nephew Hannibal had established themselves in the Taralga region where they helped pioneer Australia's wool industry. A private village was established on land donated by James Macarthur and cleared by convicts in order to house and service members of the Macarthur family and their employees. Orchard Street, now the main thoroughfare is located on the site of Macarthur's orchard.  

A railway line was opened to Strathaird in 1926.

See also
 Taralga
 Goulburn
 Bannaby, New South Wales

References 

Towns in New South Wales
Southern Tablelands
Localities in New South Wales
Geography of New South Wales